This is a list of electoral division results for the Australian 1984 federal election in the state of South Australia.

Overall results

Results by division

Adelaide

Barker

Bonython

Boothby

Grey

Hawker

Hindmarsh

Kingston

Makin

Mayo

Port Adelaide

Sturt

Wakefield

See also 
 Results of the 1984 Australian federal election (House of Representatives)
 Members of the Australian House of Representatives, 1984–1987

References 

South Australia 1984